The Cătușa is a left tributary of the river Siret in Romania. It flows into the Siret near the city Galați.

References

Rivers of Romania
Rivers of Galați County